Tipling may refer to:

 Tipling, Nepal, village in Dhading District
 David Tipling, British photographer